The North Atlantic Gyre of the Atlantic Ocean is one of five great oceanic gyres. It is a circular ocean current, with offshoot eddies and sub-gyres, across the North Atlantic from the Intertropical Convergence Zone (calms or doldrums) to the part south of Iceland, and from the east coasts of North America to the west coasts of Europe and Africa.

In turn it is chiefly subdivided into the Gulf Stream of the west, its often conflated continuation, the North Atlantic Current across the north, the Canary Current flowing southward along the east, and the Atlantic's North Equatorial Current in the south. The gyre has a pronounced thermohaline circulation, bringing salty water west from the Mediterranean Sea and then north to form the North Atlantic Deep Water.

The gyre traps anthropogenic (human-made) marine debris in its natural garbage or flotsam patch, in the same way the North Pacific Gyre has the Great Pacific garbage patch.

At the heart of the gyre is the Sargasso Sea, noted for its still waters and quite dense seaweed accumulations.

Seasonal variability
As with many oceanographic patterns, the North Atlantic Gyre experiences seasonal changes. Stramma and Siedler (1988) determined that the gyre expands and contracts with a seasonal variance; however, the magnitude of volume transport does not seem to change significantly. During the Northern Hemisphere winter season, the gyre follows a more zonal pattern; that is, it expands in the east-west direction and thins in the north-south direction. As the seasons move from winter to summer, the gyre shifts south by a few degrees latitude. This occurs concurrently with the displacement of the northeastern part of the gyre. It has been concluded that zonal deviations within the gyre remain small while north and south of the gyre they are large.

Data collected in the Sargasso Sea region in the western part of the North Atlantic Gyre has led to analytical evidence that the variability of this gyre is linked to wintertime convective mixing. According to Bates (2001), a seasonal variation of 8-10 °C in surface temperature occurs alongside a fluctuation in the mixed layer depth between the Northern Hemisphere winter and summer seasons. The depth rises from 200 meters in winter to about 10 meters in summer. Nutrients remain below the euphotic zone for most of the year, resulting in low primary production. Yet during winter convective mixing, nutrients penetrate the euphotic zone, causing a short-lived phytoplankton bloom in the spring. This then lifts the mixed-layer depth to 10 meters.

The changes in oceanic biology and vertical mixing between winter and summer in the North Atlantic Gyre seasonally alter the total amount of carbon dioxide in the seawater. Interannual trends have established that carbon dioxide concentrations within this gyre are increasing at a similar rate to that occurring in the atmosphere. This discovery concurs with that made in the North Pacific Gyre. The North Atlantic Gyre also undergoes temperature changes via atmospheric wave patterns. The North Atlantic Oscillation (NAO) is one such pattern. During its positive phase, the gyre warms. This is due to a weakening of the westerly winds, resulting in reduced wind stress and heat exchange, providing a greater period of time for the gyre water temperatures to rise.

Lead contamination
Measured samples of aerosols, marine particles, and water in the gyre from 1990–92 include examining lead isotope ratios. Certain isotopes are hallmarks of pollution essentially from Europe and the near Middle East by trade winds; other contamination was primarily caused by American emissions. The surface layers of the Sargasso Sea were read for such concentrations. 42–57% of the contamination came from American industrial and automotive sources, despite the reduction in the production and use of leaded gasoline in the United States. Since 1992 lead has clearly reducing concentrations – this is theorised to hold true across the Atlantic in surface layers.

Garbage patch

See also
 Ocean current
 Oceanic gyre
 Volta do mar

References

External links
 Ocean currents

Currents of the Atlantic Ocean
Oceanic gyres